The National Federation of Cypriots in the United Kingdom is a London-based umbrella organisation incorporating Cypriot associations in the United Kingdom. Its member associations include "refugee organisations; village organisations; missing persons organisations; UK branches of Cypriot political parties; educational societies; cultural, professional, sports and student groups; and philanthropic organisations".

The Federation is a member association of the international organisation, POMAK (The World Federation of Overseas Cypriots).

History
The Federation was founded immediately after the Turkish invasion of Cyprus in 1974. It functions under a President, an Executive and a Secretariat elected every two years and is headquartered in North London.

Christos Karaolis was elected as the fifth President of the Federation in June 2015. Karaolis is the first third generation Greek Cypriot elected to that position following eight years as President of NEPOMAK (the World Organisation for Young Overseas Cypriots).

Summary of roles and aims

As the foremost representative body of UK Cypriots, the Federation performs a two-fold role. Firstly, it spearheads the British Cypriot community's efforts to promote the cause of a reunited Cyprus, free from Turkish occupation troops and illegal colonists, for the benefit of all Cypriots. Secondly, it coordinates the work of UK Cypriots in the political, social, cultural and educational spheres as well as lobbies for and articulates the interests and concerns of the Cypriot community in the United Kingdom. In pursuing its objectives, the Federation co-operates closely with the democratically elected President and the Government of the Republic of Cyprus. The Federation also fosters close links with the British Government, the leadership of British political parties, British parliamentarians, civic and community leaders, ethnic minorities, the mass media and other relevant institutions in the United Kingdom.

Description by the House of Commons
The National Federation of Cypriots in the UK "is an organisation representing almost all Greek Cypriot community associations in the UK, many of which are themselves "special purpose federations".

References

External links
 Official website

Diaspora organisations based in London